"Kiss This" is a song by English rock band the Struts. It was released April 7, 2014, as the second single from their debut studio album Everybody Wants. The song began to climb the charts in America in 2015 and 2016 causing an increase in popularity. Lyrically, the song recalls a personal experience of lead vocalist Luke Spiller, whose girlfriend at the time had been cheating on him with one of his close friends. He was not particularly fond of the idea of the song indulging in self-pity. Instead, the band uses power riffs and an in-your-face chorus. Due to this shift in perspective, the song became a liberating anthem about standing up on your own two feet. The band describes "Kiss This" as having a typical rock and roll progression. For the song, the band took the feeling of the Rolling Stones' song "Sympathy for the Devil" and mixed a hip-hop element in it. The band believes the song is their version of a ‘Young Hearts Run Free’-type song but in a rock mentality.

Music video
The second music video was released on 8 February 2016.

Charts

Weekly charts

Year-end charts

References

Songs about kissing
2015 singles
2015 songs
The Struts songs
Interscope Records singles
Songs written by Josh Wilkinson
Song recordings produced by Red Triangle (production team)
Songs written by Rick Parkhouse
Songs written by George Tizzard